Longidoridae (longidorid nematodes) is a family of polyphagous root ectoparasites in the phylum Nematoda (nematodes) with a worldwide distribution.

Taxonomy
There are about 720 species divided amongst seven genera in the family, which is further subdivided into subfamilies and tribes.

Subdivision 
Subfamilies;
Longidorinae (480 spp.)
Xiphineminae (240 spp.)

Tribes;
Subfamily Longidorinae
Longidorini
Xiphidorini
Subfamily Xiphineminae

Genera 
Subfamily Longidorinae
Tribe Longidorini
Longidorus (144 spp.) 
Longidoroides (13 spp.)
Paralongidorus (72 spp.)
Tribe Xiphidorini
Australodorus (1 sp.)
Paraxiphidorus (3 spp.)
Xiphidorus (8 spp.)
Subfamily Xiphineminae
Xiphinema (some 240 spp.)

Pathology 
With the Trichodoridae, the Longidoridae form the two Enoplea nematode families known to be plant parasites, though from different subclasses, and the only virus vectors (particularly nepoviruses) in phylum Nematoda.

References

Bibliography 

 
Nematode families